Mian Mahmud Ali Kasuri (1910–1987) was a prominent Pakistani opposition politician, human rights advocate and lawyer who became a Senior Advocate Supreme Court.

He joined the He served in the Indian National Congress (INC) Party before Pakistan's creation, as well as the All-India Muslim League; and subsequently formed the Azad Pakistan Party before becoming one of the founders of the National Awami Party (NAP), briefly serving as the party President. As a leftist lawyer, he was a recipient of the Stalin Peace Prize as well as serving on the Russell Tribunal, created by Bertrand Russell for trying American war crimes in Vietnam. He developed a close association with Zulfiqar Bhutto following the latter's imprisonment in 1968; this in addition to his frustration with the NAP led to his quitting the party.

In 1970, he joined the Pakistan Peoples Party (PPP) and was elected in a by-election on one of the seats won by party founder Zulfiqar Ali Bhutto. He played a key role in the formation of Pakistan's first constitution in 1973. He later left the PPP after becoming disillusioned with the increasing brutality with which the government targeted the opposition. He also defended his former comrades in the National Awami Party when they were imprisoned by the PPP government for high treason. After leaving the PPP he joined the opposition Tehrik-e-Istiqlal of Asghar Khan in 1973, remaining associated with that party until his death in 1987. He was educated at Islamia College, Lahore.

See also
 Khurshid Mahmud Kasuri, son

References

Further reading 
 Mian Mahmood Ali Kasuri: Remembering a Dreamer, The Friday Times, Lahore, April 22–28, 1993.
 Bhutto Arrests More Opponents and Imposes a Curfew on 3 Cities, The New York Times, 6 May 1977.
 
 

Pakistani lawyers
Punjabi people
Year of death missing
1910 births
Pakistan People's Party politicians
Pakistani MNAs 1972–1977
People from Lahore